David Stanton (born 15 February 1957) is an Irish Fine Gael politician who has been a Teachta Dála (TD) for the Cork East constituency since 1997. He served as a Minister of State from 2016 to 2020.

Stanton was born in County Cork. He was educated at St. Colman's Vocational School, Midleton; Sharman Crawford Technical Institute, Cork and University College Cork where he received a Bachelor of Arts degree in Sociology and Mathematics. Before entering politics, he was a woodwork and technical drawing teacher and a career guidance counsellor in St Colman's Community College in Midleton. Stanton served in the Reserve Defence Forces (RDF) as an officer in the Army Reserve. He is married to Mary Lehane and they have four sons.

Stanton was first elected to Dáil Éireann at the 1997 general election and has been re-elected at every general election since. He was party Spokesperson on Social and Family Affairs, and Equality from 2004 to 2007. Prior to this he acted as deputy Spokesperson on Education and Science, and Spokesperson on Labour Affairs, Consumer Rights and Trade from 1997 to 2002. From 2007 to 2010, he was party Assistant Chief Whip (Dáil Reform) with special responsibility for Disability Issues. In July 2010, he was appointed Spokesperson on Defence.

On 19 May 2016, Stanton was appointed by the Fine Gael–Independent government on the nomination of Taoiseach Enda Kenny as Minister of State at the Department of Justice and Equality with special responsibility for Equality, Immigration, and Integration. On 20 June 2017, he was appointed by the government formed by Leo Varadkar to the same position.

At the general election in February 2020, Stanton was re-elected in the Cork East constituency.

References

External links

David Stanton's page on the Fine Gael website

 

1957 births
Living people
Alumni of University College Cork
Fine Gael TDs
Military personnel from County Cork
Members of the 28th Dáil
Members of the 29th Dáil
Members of the 30th Dáil
Members of the 31st Dáil
Members of the 32nd Dáil
Members of the 33rd Dáil
Ministers of State of the 32nd Dáil
Politicians from County Cork